Mark Blandford may refer to:

 Mark Blandford (entrepreneur) (born 1957), English businessman, founder of Sportingbet plc
 Mark Harden Blandford (1826–1902), American soldier, attorney, politician and judge